Tower Road is a designated place within the Cape Breton Regional Municipality in Nova Scotia, Canada.

Demographics 

References

Communities in Cape Breton County
Designated places in Nova Scotia